The canton of L'Haÿ-les-Roses is an administrative division of the Val-de-Marne department, Île-de-France region, northern France. Its borders were modified at the French canton reorganisation which came into effect in March 2015. Its seat is in L'Haÿ-les-Roses.

It consists of the following communes:
Fresnes
L'Haÿ-les-Roses

References

Cantons of Val-de-Marne